Giesel is a small river of Hesse, Germany. It flows into the Fulda near the town Fulda.

See also
List of rivers of Hesse

References

Rivers of Hesse
East Hesse
Rivers of the Vogelsberg
Rivers of Germany